Marko Simonovski  (born June 28, 1989) is a Macedonian professional basketball player who plays for TFT. He is also member of Macedonian national basketball team.

National team
Simonovski is also a member of the Macedonian national basketball team. He competed with the team at Eurobasket 2011 and helped the team to a fourth-place finish, its best ever performance at the continental championship.

References

External links
Marko Simonovski Eurobasket Profile
Marko Simonovski Interperformances Profile

1989 births
Living people
ABA League players
KK MZT Skopje players
KK Rabotnički players
KK Vardar players
Macedonian men's basketball players
Shooting guards
Sportspeople from Skopje
Traiskirchen Lions players